Rajasak Sor.Vorapin (born: February 23, 1967 in Buriram) is a retired Muay Thai fighter.

Biography and career
Rajasak started fighting in Muay Thai at the age of 14. He was trained by his father at his home in the Buriram province and was competing in the neighbouring provinces of Surin, Ubon Ratchathani and Korat. In 1987 he moved to Bangkok to join the Sor.Vorapin camp.

In 1989 he defeated Ekaphon Chuwattana to capture the Rajadamnern stadium 115 lbs title. Later the same year he was matched with Langsuan Panyuthaphum in a fight billed as a champion against champion matchup. He was defeated by decision but won the rematch less than a month later.

Rajasak became a successful fighter of the Bangkok circuit with his heavy knee style, he mostly fought for the promotor Klaew Thanikhul. During his career he won the Rajadamnern Sadium belt at three different weights and defeated notable fighters of his era such as Langsuan Panyuthaphum, Jaroenthong Kiatbanchong, Therdkiat Sitthepitak, Robert Kaennorasing or Chamuekpet Hapalang.

After his fighting career Rajsak became a trainer, first at his old camp the Sor Vorapin and later in various camps, among them the Emerald Gym, Petchprasit Gym, Jitti gym, Phetsithong and 7MuayThai Gym.

Titles and accomplishments
Rajadamnern Stadium
 Rajadamnern Stadium Fighter of the Year
 1989 Rajadamnern Stadium 115 lbs Champion
 1990 Rajadamnern Stadium 122 lbs Champion (One defense)
 1991 Rajadamnern Stadium 126 lbs Champion

Fight record

|-  style="background:#c5d2ea;"
| 2000-09-22 || Draw||align=left| Lakhin Sakjawee || Rajadamnern Stadium  || Bangkok, Thailand || Decision || 5 || 3:00

|-  style="background:#cfc;"
| 1999- || Win||align=left| Ahmed Lain ||   || France || KO ||  1|| 

|-  style="background:#fbb;"
| 1999- || Loss ||align=left| Karim Saada ||   || France || Decision || 5 || 3:00

|-  style="background:#fbb;"
| 1995-09-04 || Loss ||align=left| Panmongkol Carriboy || Rajadamnern Stadium  || Bangkok, Thailand || Decision || 5 || 3:00

|-  style="background:#fbb;"
| 1995-07-05 || Loss ||align=left| Prabpramlek Sitsantad || Rajadamnern Stadium  || Bangkok, Thailand || Decision || 5 || 3:00

|-  style="background:#fbb;"
| 1995-05-22 || Loss ||align=left| Panmongkol Carriboy || Rajadamnern Stadium  || Bangkok, Thailand || Decision || 5 || 3:00

|-  style="background:#fbb;" 
| 1995-02-01 || Loss ||align=left| Nuathoranee Wor.Taweekiat || Rajadamnern Stadium  || Bangkok, Thailand || Decision || 5 || 3:00

|-  style="background:#cfc;" 
| 1994-12- || Win ||align=left| Taweechai Wor Preecha || Rajadamnern Stadium  || Bangkok, Thailand || Decision || 5 || 3:00

|-  style="background:#cfc;"
| 1994-10-12 || Win||align=left| Jongrak Khaadisorn|| Rajadamnern Stadium  || Bangkok, Thailand || Decision || 5 || 3:00

|-  style="background:#cfc;" 
| 1994-03- || Win ||align=left| Samingnoi Sor Thanikul || Rajadamnern Stadium  || Bangkok, Thailand || Decision || 5 || 3:00

|-  style="background:#fbb;"
| 1994-02-10 || Loss ||align=left| Phannarin Sor.Suwanpakdee || Rajadamnern Stadium  || Bangkok, Thailand || Decision || 5 || 3:00

|-  style="background:#cfc;" 
| 1994-01-13 || Win ||align=left| Phannarin Sor.Suwanpakdee || Rajadamnern Stadium  || Bangkok, Thailand || Decision || 5 || 3:00

|-  style="background:#cfc;"
| 1993-11-10 || Win||align=left| Neungsiam Kiatwichian || Rajadamnern Stadium  || Bangkok, Thailand || Decision || 5 || 3:00

|-  style="background:#cfc;"
| 1993-10-06 || Win||align=left| Banluedet Lukprabat || Rajadamnern Stadium  || Bangkok, Thailand || Decision || 5 || 3:00

|-  style="background:#cfc;"
| 1993-03-25 || Win||align=left| Palangphet || Rajadamnern Stadium  || Bangkok, Thailand || Decision || 5 || 3:00

|-  style="background:#;"
| 1992-11-11 ||  ||align=left| Jack Kiatniwat || Rajadamnern Stadium || Bangkok, Thailand || ||  ||

|-  style="background:#cfc;"
| 1992-10-05 || Win||align=left| Padphon Dejritta || Lumpinee Stadium || Bangkok, Thailand || Decision || 5 || 3:00

|-  style="background:#fbb;"
| 1992-07-01 || Loss ||align=left| Suwitlek Lukbangplasoi || Lumpinee Stadium || Bangkok, Thailand || Decision || 5 || 3:00

|-  style="background:#fbb;"
| 1992-06-19 || Loss ||align=left| Kangwannoi Or Seebualoi || Lumpinee Stadium || Bangkok, Thailand || Decision || 5 || 3:00

|-  style="background:#fbb;"
| 1992-03-25 || Loss ||align=left| Robert Kaennorasing || Rajadamnern Stadium || Bangkok, Thailand || Decision  || 5 || 3:00 
|-
! style=background:white colspan=9 |

|-  style="background:#fbb;"
| 1992-02-19 || Loss ||align=left| Noppadet Sor.Rewadee ||  Lumpinee Stadium || Bangkok, Thailand || Decision || 5 || 3:00

|-  style="background:#fbb;"
| 1992-01-22 || Loss ||align=left| Kompetch Lukprabat || Lumpinee Stadium || Bangkok, Thailand || Decision || 5 || 3:00

|-  style="background:#cfc;"
| 1991-12-18 || Win||align=left| Neungsiam Kiatwichian || Rajadamnern Stadium  || Bangkok, Thailand || Decision || 5 || 3:00

|-  style="background:#fbb;"
| 1991-11-29 || Loss||align=left| Neungsiam Kiatwichian || Rajadamnern Stadium  || Bangkok, Thailand || Decision || 5 || 3:00

|-  style="background:#cfc;"
| 1991-01-30 || Win ||align=left| Jack Kiatniwat || Rajadamnern Stadium || Bangkok, Thailand || Decision||5  || 3:00

|-  style="background:#fbb;"
| 1991-09- || Loss ||align=left| Robert Kaennorasing || Rajadamnern Stadium || Bangkok, Thailand || Decision || 5 || 3:00

|-  style="background:#fbb;"
| 1991-08- ||Loss||align=left| Taweechai Wor.Preecha || Rajadamnern Stadium || Bangkok, Thailand || Decision||5  || 3:00
|-
! style=background:white colspan=9 |

|-  style="background:#cfc;"
| 1991-07-20|| Win ||align=left| Chamuekpet Hapalang || Crocodile Farm || Samut Prakan, Thailand || Decision || 5 || 3:00 
|-
! style=background:white colspan=9 |

|-  style="background:#cfc;"
| 1991-06-19 || Win||align=left| Robert Kaennorasing  || Rajadamnern Stadium || Bangkok, Thailand || Decision  || 5 || 3:00

|-  style="background:#cfc;"
| 1991-05-26 || Win||align=left| Jack Kiatniwat || MAJKF || Tokyo, Japan || TKO (Doctor Stoppage)  || 1 || 2:26

|-  style="background:#fbb;"
| 1991-05- ||Loss||align=left| Padphon Dejritta || Rajadamnern Stadium || Bangkok, Thailand || Decision||5  || 3:00

|-  style="background:#cfc;"
| 1991-04-07 ||Win||align=left| Padejsuk Kiatsamran ||  || Samut Sakhon, Thailand || Decision||5  || 3:00

|-  style="background:#fbb;"
| 1991-02-15 ||Loss||align=left| Therdkiat Sitthepitak ||  || Phra Nakhon Si Ayutthaya, Thailand || Decision||5  || 3:00

|-  style="background:#fbb;"
| 1991-01-30 ||Loss||align=left| Jaroenthong Kiatbanchong || Rajadamnern Stadium || Bangkok, Thailand || Decision||5  || 3:00

|-  style="background:#cfc;"
| 1990-12-20 || Win||align=left| Therdkiat Sitthepitak || Rajadamnern Stadium || Bangkok, Thailand || Decision || 5 || 3:00

|-  style="background:#cfc;"
| 1990-11-29 || Win||align=left| Neungsiam Kiatwichian || Rajadamnern Stadium  || Bangkok, Thailand || Decision || 5 || 3:00
|-
! style=background:white colspan=9 |

|-  style="background:#cfc;"
| 1990-11-05 || Win||align=left| Taweechai Wor.Preecha || Rajadamnern Stadium || Bangkok, Thailand || Decision || 5 || 3:00

|-  style="background:#fbb;"
| 1990-09-25 || Loss||align=left| Jaroenthong Kiatbanchong || Lumpinee Stadium || Bangkok, Thailand || Decision || 5 || 3:00

|-  style="background:#cfc;"
| 1990-08-15 || Win||align=left| Jaroenthong Kiatbanchong || Rajadamnern Stadium || Bangkok, Thailand || Decision || 5 || 3:00

|-  style="background:#cfc;"
| 1990-07-09 || Win||align=left| Padejsuk Kiatsamran || Rajadamnern Stadium  || Bangkok, Thailand || Decision || 5 || 3:00
|-
! style=background:white colspan=9 |

|-  style="background:#cfc;"
| 1990-06-14 || Win||align=left| Chanalert Muanghatyai  ||  || Bangkok, Thailand || Decision || 5 || 3:00

|-  style="background:#fbb;"
| 1990-05-10 || Loss ||align=left| Chanalert Muanghatyai || Rajadamnern Stadium || Bangkok, Thailand || Decision || 5 || 3:00

|-  style="background:#fbb;"
| 1990-04-25 || Loss ||align=left| Chanalert Muanghatyai || Rajadamnern Stadium || Bangkok, Thailand || Decision || 5 || 3:00
|-
! style=background:white colspan=9 |

|-  style="background:#cfc;"
| 1990-02-22 || Win||align=left| Padejsuk Kiatsamran || Rajadamnern Stadium || Bangkok, Thailand || Decision || 5 || 3:00

|-  style="background:#cfc;"
| 1990-01-04 || Win||align=left| Mahaheng Tor.Boonlert || Rajadamnern Stadium || Bangkok, Thailand || Decision || 5 || 3:00

|-  style="background:#cfc;"
| 1989-11-27 || Win||align=left| Langsuan Panyuthaphum || Rajadamnern Stadium || Bangkok, Thailand || Decision || 5 || 3:00

|-  style="background:#fbb;"
| 1989-11-02 || Loss ||align=left| Langsuan Panyuthaphum || Rajadamnern Stadium, Lumpinee vs Rajadamnern champion || Bangkok, Thailand || Decision || 5 || 3:00

|-  style="background:#cfc;"
| 1989-09-25 || Win||align=left| Dennua Denmolee || Rajadamnern Stadium  || Bangkok, Thailand || Decision || 5 || 3:00

|-  style="background:#cfc;"
| 1989-07-13 || Win||align=left| Ekaphon Chuwattana || Rajadamnern Stadium  || Bangkok, Thailand || Decision || 5 || 3:00
|-
! style=background:white colspan=9 |

|-  style="background:#c5d2ea;"
| 1989-06-15 || Draw||align=left| Ekaphon Chuwattana || Rajadamnern Stadium  || Bangkok, Thailand || Decision || 5 || 3:00
|-
! style=background:white colspan=9 |

|-  style="background:#cfc;"
| 1989-04-27 || Win ||align=left| Saenphet Chor.Waikul ||   Rajadamnern Stadium || Bangkok, Thailand || Decision || 5 || 3:00

|-  style="background:#cfc;"
| 1989-04-10 || Win ||align=left| Samernoi Tor.Boonlert ||  Rajadamnern Stadium  || Bangkok, Thailand || Decision || 5 || 3:00

|-  style="background:#cfc;"
| 1989-03-23 || Win ||align=left| Lom-Isannoi Sor.Thanikul || Rajadamnern Stadium   || Bangkok, Thailand || Decision || 5 || 3:00

|-  style="background:#fbb;"
| 1989-01-25 || Loss ||align=left| Samernoi Tor.Boonlert || Rajadamnern Stadium   || Bangkok, Thailand || Decision || 5 || 3:00

|-  style="background:#fbb;"
| 1988-12-22 || Loss||align=left| Waifai Prapatmotor || Rajadamnern Stadium  || Bangkok, Thailand || Decision || 5 || 3:00

|-  style="background:#cfc;"
| 1988-10-19 || Win ||align=left| Toiting Kiatphetnoi || Rajadamnern Stadium  || Bangkok, Thailand || Decision || 5 || 3:00

|-  style="background:#c5d2ea;"
| 1988- || Draw ||align=left| Yodkunthap Sikrupat || Rajadamnern Stadium  || Bangkok, Thailand || Decision || 5 || 3:00

|-  style="background:#cfc;"
| 1988- || Win ||align=left| Senrak Lukprabat || Rajadamnern Stadium  || Bangkok, Thailand || Decision || 5 || 3:00

|-  style="background:#cfc;"
| 1988- || Win ||align=left| Nampetch Moisayon || Rajadamnern Stadium  || Bangkok, Thailand || Decision || 5 || 3:00

|-  style="background:#cfc;"
| 1988- || Win ||align=left| Den Yuthakit || Rajadamnern Stadium  || Bangkok, Thailand || Decision || 5 || 3:00

|-  style="background:#cfc;"
| 1988- || Win ||align=left| Kukai Kaisingprum || Rajadamnern Stadium  || Bangkok, Thailand || Decision || 5 || 3:00

|-  style="background:#cfc;"
| 1988- || Win ||align=left| Sameulek Sor Pariya  || Rajadamnern Stadium  || Bangkok, Thailand || Decision || 5 || 3:00

|-  style="background:#fbb;"
| 1987- || Loss ||align=left| Chokchai Majestic || Rajadamnern Stadium  || Bangkok, Thailand || Decision ||5 ||3:00 

|-  style="background:#cfc;"
| 1987- || Win ||align=left| Saphaynoi Por Chaiwan || Rajadamnern Stadium  || Bangkok, Thailand || Decision ||5 ||3:00 

|-  style="background:#cfc;"
| 1987- || Win ||align=left| Noppadet Lukprabat || Rajadamnern Stadium  || Bangkok, Thailand || Decision ||5 ||3:00 

|-  style="background:#cfc;"
| 1987- || Win ||align=left| Boonsom Bualuang-Prakanpay || Rajadamnern Stadium  || Bangkok, Thailand || Decision ||5 ||3:00 

|-  style="background:#cfc;"
| 1987- || Win ||align=left| Sorakom Kiatisrirang || Rajadamnern Stadium  || Bangkok, Thailand || Decision ||5 ||3:00 

|-  style="background:#cfc;"
| 1987- || Win ||align=left| Yodmangson Sitmuangthong || Rajadamnern Stadium  || Bangkok, Thailand || KO || || 
|-
| colspan=9 | Legend:

References

1967 births
Living people
Rajasak Sor.Vorapin
Muay Thai trainers
Rajasak Sor.Vorapin